The 2016–17 Azerbaijan Premier League was the 25th season of the Azerbaijan Premier League, the Azerbaijani professional league for association football clubs, since its establishment in 1992. Qarabağ were the defending champions, having won the previous season. The season began on 6 August 2016 and concluded on 29 April 2017.

On 16 April 2017, Qarabağ defeated Inter Baku 3–0 to successfully defend their league title - their fourth league title in a row and fifth overall.

Teams
On 13 June 2016 the Professional Football League of Azerbaijan announced that both Khazar Lankaran, and Ravan, had been refused licenses to play in the 2016–17 Premier League and that no First Division teams would replace them.

On 25 April 2017, Zira were awarded a 3–0 victory over Neftçi Baku after Neftçi Baku fielded 7 foreign players in their 2–2 draw on 23 April 2017.

Note: Table lists in alphabetical order.

Personnel and kits

Note: Flags indicate national team as has been defined under FIFA eligibility rules. Players may hold more than one non-FIFA nationality.

Stadiums

Managerial changes

League table

Results

Games 1–14

Games 15–28

Season statistics

Top scorers

Top assists

Hat-tricks

Scoring
 First goal of the season: Elvin Badalov for Neftçi Baku against AZAL (6 August 2016)
 Fastest goal of the season: 2nd minute, 
 Reynaldo for Qarabağ against AZAL (9 September 2016)

References

External links
 

2016–17 in European association football leagues
2016–17
1